Alabama was a Canadian band of the early 1970s. Band members were Buster Fykes, Hector McLean, Rick Knight, and Len Sembaluk. The band performed a mix of Progressive Rock, cajun, country and soul music, including songs written by Fykes and Knight.

History
In 1973 Alabama released their only album, Close to Home, on Smile Records. In addition to the band members, the album was recorded with Al Cherney on fiddle, and Hagood Hardy on Vibraphone. The first released single, "Song of Love",  appeared on the top 100 in the RPM Magazine chart, peaking at No. 26 in June that year. A second single, "Highway Driving", was written by Fykes and Knight and was released through Maple Creek Music; it reached No. 42 in August 1973. At the Juno Awards of 1974, "Highway Driving" was nominated for Canadian Country Single of the year in 1974; Alabama also received a nomination as Best Country Group. Alabama disbanded in 1974.

Discography

Albums

Singles

References

External links
 Alabama at AllMusic
 

Musical groups established in 1973
Musical groups disestablished in 1974
Musical groups from Toronto
Canadian country music groups
Canadian folk music groups
1973 establishments in Ontario
1974 disestablishments in Ontario